HSC High Speed Jet is a  ocean-going catamaran built in 1990 by Incat for Hoverspeed and currently owned by Seajets. In 1990, as Hoverspeed Great Britain, she took the Hales Trophy for the fastest eastbound transatlantic journey, making the run, without passengers, in three days, seven hours and fifty-four minutes, averaging .

History
The ship's previous names were: Hoverspeed Great Britain (1990–2004), Emeraude GB (2004–2005), and Speedrunner 1 (2005–2008, when she sailed the Mediterranean Sea for Sea Containers and Aegean Speed Lines.) Sea Runner (2008–2011) and Cosmos Jet (2011–2015, when she first began operating for Seajets).

She entered service on the Portsmouth to Cherbourg route on 12 July 1990 operating three round trips per day. HSC Hoverspeed Great Britain was replaced on the cross-channel route by MDV 1200 class ferries Superseacat One and Superseacat Two.

Specifications
Power is supplied by four Ruston 16RK270 V-16 marine diesel engines each with a 3600 kW (4825 hp) at 100% maximum continuous rating (MCR).

The 16RK270 engine has 16 cylinders, a 270 mm bore and a 305mm stroke, for a per cylinder displacement of 17.46L and a total displacement of 279.408L.

References

External links
 HSC Sea Runner image gallery at Incat
 Shipbuilder info

|-

Ships of Seajets
1990 ships
Blue Riband holders
Incat high-speed craft
Ferries of Greece
Individual catamarans
Ships built by Incat